Juice B Crypts is the fourth studio album by American experimental rock band Battles, produced by Chris Tabron, and released through Warp on October 16, 2019. It is the band's first album as a duo, following guitarist/bassist Dave Konopka's departure in 2018. 

Battles toured Europe and North America from April to December 2019 in support of the album.

Background
Guitarist Ian Williams stated that the album is about "chord progressions, resolutions, returning home" but also using a "blender of modern electronic tools like glitching devices" to "regurgitate" "melodic lines and [...] at the same time try and retain harmonic relationships while completely smashing them up". Warp described the album as "a sensory overload of information" featuring "synthesizer loops, cut-throat drum patterns, and cyclical riffs".

Yes frontman Jon Anderson, who sings on the track "Sugar Foot", was a fan of Battles and had offered to collaborate with the band. Drummer John Stanier said: "About eight or nine years ago, [Anderson]'s management contacted us or me: 'Jon Anderson from Yes wants you to play drums on one of these songs on his solo record. He is really into Battles.' It didn’t work out timing-wise or whatever. Then Jon Anderson emailed me back and was like, 'Love Battles. By the way, anytime you guys want to do a collabo, let me know. I’ll do vocals'."

The title "Juice B Crypts" originated from Williams' two children.

Critical reception

 Heather Phares from AllMusic compared the album favourably to the band's oeuvre, claiming that "Battles pack so much into Juice B Crypts that, perhaps more than any of their albums since Mirrored, it needs to be taken as a whole to appreciate its constantly changing, consistently engaging sounds."

Exclaim! critic Owen Torrey called the album "11 tracks of knotty, electronic rock puzzles", and wrote that from the start of the first song, "Ambulance", "Battles are back at the complex craft of building sequences out of repetition, alteration, layering", summarizing that it is "the sound of a band who continue to create after more than a decade — tempered with loss, yes, but also joy, also freedom". Writing for NME, Will Richards felt that Juice B Crypts is "an intricate and complex album that nonetheless bottles the joy and immediacy of the band's best work" as well as one that "indulges the weird and wonderful side of Battles while also, simply, giving the people what they want".

Seth Wilson was more reserved in the review for Slant, stating that the album "occasionally threatens to collapse beneath the weight of its overstuffed songs. But even when it’s too maximalist for its own good, Battles’s music is still compelling." In the review for Pitchfork, Grayson Harver Currin concluded that "Juice B Crypts is anti-gestalt music, where incredible parts are subsumed by wholes that try to do too much. You’re left to wonder if Stanier and Williams feel they have to prove themselves again. Or perhaps they’re aware that the polyglot power that made their early work so powerful is almost passé now, as the lines between genres corrode. Either way, Juice B Crypts is an act of overcompensation from a duo trying to make too much happen with less."

Track listing

Personnel
Battles
Ian Williams – keyboards, synthesizers, guitar, bass, effects, abelton push, composer
John Stanier – drums, percussion, composer

Additional musicians
Tune-Yards – vocals, instrumention
Sal Principato – vocals
Shabazz Palaces – vocals, instrumention
Prairie WWWW– vocals, instrumention
Xenia Rubinos – vocals
Jon Anderson – vocals

Studio personnel
Heba Kadry – mastering
Nate Odden – engineering
Brandon Peralta – engineering, mixing assistant
Chris Tabron – mixing, producer

Artwork
Andrew Kuo – artwork
Caleb Halter – design, layout

Charts

References

2019 albums
Battles (band) albums